Cabezón is the Spanish word for "stubborn" or "big-headed".
In Chile, cabezon means intelligent.
Cabezon or cabezón may refer to:

Fish species
 Cabezon (fish) (Scorpaenichthys marmoratus), a species of fish in the family Cottidae 
 Cachorrito cabezon, a species of fish in the family Cyprinodontidae

People

Surname
 Antonio de Cabezón (1510–1566), Spanish composer
 Isaías Cabezón (1891–1963), Chilean artist and member of Grupo Montparnasse
 José Ignacio Cabezón, American Buddhist scholar and translator, and editor of the Journal of the International Association of Tibetan Studies
 Francisco Javier Sánchez Cabezón, bishop of the Roman Catholic Diocese of Astorga

Nickname
 Omar Sívori (1935–2005), Argentine football forward nicknamed El Cabezón
 Oscar Ruggeri (born 1962), Argentine football player nicknamed El Cabezón
 Andrés D'Alessandro (born 1981), Argentine football player nicknamed El Cabezón
 José Froilán González, Argentine racing driver nicknamed El Cabezón

Places
 Cabezón de Pisuerga, a Spanish municipality of Castile and León
 Cabezón de Valderaduey, a Spanish municipality of Castile and León
 Cabezón de la Sierra, a Spanish municipality of Castile and León
 Cabezón de Cameros, a Spanish municipality of La Rioja
 Cabezón de Liébana, a Spanish municipality of Cantabria
 Cabezón de la Sal, a Spanish municipality of Cantabria
 Cabazon Indian Reservation in California, United States
 El Cabezón, an area in Jalisco, Mexico; see Area codes in Mexico by code (300-399)
 Cabezon, New Mexico, a ghost town in the US
 Cabezon Peak, a volcanic neck in New Mexico

Other
 Cabezon, a song by Red House Painters
 , American submarine
 Cabezón, a character in children's book Gorgorín e Cabezón (1992) by Uxío Novoneyra
 Battle of Cabezón, a small event in 1808, part of the Peninsular War

See also
 
 Cabazon
 Cabezones, an Argentine hardcore-alternative rock band